Diana M. Fennell (born August 6, 1967) is an American politician who represents District 47A in the Maryland House of Delegates. She previously served as the mayor of Colmar Manor, Maryland from 2000 to 2010 and as a member of the Colmar Manor town council from 1995 to 2000.

Background
Fennell was born on August 6, 1967 in Emporia, Virginia, where she graduated from Greensville County High School. In 2004, she attended the Academy for Excellence in Local Governance at the University of Maryland, College Park School of Public Policy.

Fennell moved from Washington, D.C. to Colmar Manor, Maryland in the early 1990s. In 1994, a neighbor urged her to seek public office. She successfully ran for Colmar Manor town council and was sworn in 1995. In 2000, she was elected as the town's mayor, where she served until 2010.

In 2002, Fennell ran for the Maryland House of Delegates in District 47. She came in fourth place in the primary election, receiving 13.1 percent of the vote.

In 2014, Fennell again ran for the Maryland House of Delegates, receiving the backing of state senator Victor R. Ramirez during the primary election. She won the Democratic primary alongside Jimmy Tarlau, receiving 23.7 percent of the vote and defeating incumbent state delegate Michael Summers. She received 52.1 percent of the vote in the general election.

In the legislature
Fennell was sworn into the Maryland House of Delegates on January 14, 2015, and was assigned to the House Ways and Means Committee. In her committee, she serves on the election law subcommittee, the finance resources subcommittee, and the revenues subcommittee. She is also a member of the Prince George's County Delegation, Women Legislators of Maryland, and the Legislative Black Caucus of Maryland.

Political positions

Elections
Fennell voted for legislation introduced in the 2019 legislative session that would lift a ban on developer contributions in county political races in Prince George's County, Maryland.

Marijuana
Fennell supported legislation introduced during the 2018 legislative session that would reform the state's Medical Cannabis Commission and ensure diversity for proprietors in the industry.

Minimum wage
Fennell introduced legislation during the 2019 legislative session that would raise the minimum wage to $15 an hour in 2023 and phase out the state's tipped wage by 2026. During committee hearings, the bill was amended to push back the full-on effective date to 2025 and to remove provisions to automatically increase the wage based on the national consumer price index. The bill passed as amended and received a gubernatorial veto override on March 28, 2019.

Electoral history
2002 Race for Maryland House of Delegates – 47th District (Democratic Primary)
Voters to choose three:
{|class="wikitable"
|-
!Name
!Votes
!Percent
!Outcome
|-
|- 
|Rosetta C. Parker (Incumbent), Democratic
|3,584
|  17.2%
|   Won
|-
|- 
|Doyle Niemann, Democratic
|3,521
|  16.9%
|   Won
|-
|- 
|Victor R. Ramirez, Democratic
|3,054
|  14.6%
|   Won
|-
|- 
|Diana M. Fennell, Democratic
|2,724
|  13.1%
|   
|-
|- 
|Bob McGrory, Democratic
|2,298
|  16.6%
|   
|-
|- 
|Lee P. Walker, Democratic
|2,229
|  10.7%
|   
|-
|- 
|Lillian K. Beverly, Democratic
|1,808
|  8.7%
|   
|-
|- 
|Fred Price Jr., Democratic
|1,136
|  6.3%
|   
|-
|- 
|Theodore N. Pantazes, Democratic
|323
|  1.5%
|   
|-
|}
2014 Race for Maryland House of Delegates – 47A District (Democratic Primary)
Voters to choose two:
{|class="wikitable"
|-
!Name
!Votes
!Percent
!Outcome
|-
|- 
|Jimmy Tarlau, Democratic
|2,728
|  26.7%
|   Won
|-
|- 
|Diana Fennell, Democratic
|2,416
|  23.7%
|   Won
|-
|- 
|Michael Summers (Incumbent), Democratic
|1,740
|  17.1%
|   
|-
|- 
|Malcolm Augustine, Democratic
|1,688
|  16.6%
|   
|-
|- 
|Joseph Solomon, Democratic
|1,627
|  16%
|   
|-
|}
2014 Race for Maryland House of Delegates – 47A District (General Election)
Voters to choose two:
{|class="wikitable"
|-
!Name
!Votes
!Percent
!Outcome
|-
|- 
|Diana Fennell, Democratic
|11,198
|  52.1%
|   Won
|-
|- 
|Jimmy Tarlau, Democratic
|8,836
|  41.1%
|   Won
|-
|- 
|Fred Price Jr., Republican
|1,424
|  6.6%
|   
|-
|- 
|Other Write-Ins
|55
|  0.3%
|   
|-
|}
2018 Race for Maryland House of Delegates – 47A District (Democratic Primary)
Voters to choose two:
{|class="wikitable"
|-
!Name
!Votes
!Percent
!Outcome
|-
|- 
|Diana Fennell (Incumbent), Democratic
|5,239
|  37.8%
|   Won
|-
|- 
|Julian Ivey, Democratic
|4,504
|  32.5%
|   Won
|-
|- 
|Jimmy Tarlau (Incumbent), Democratic
|4,104
|  29.6%
|   
|-
|}
2018 Race for Maryland House of Delegates – 47A District (General Election)
Voters to choose two:
{|class="wikitable"
|-
!Name
!Votes
!Percent
!Outcome
|-
|- 
|Julian Ivey, Democratic
|15,981
|  52,2%
|   Won
|-
|- 
|Diana Fennell (Incumbent), Democratic
|14,192
|  46.4%
|   Won
|-
|- 
|Other Write-Ins
|429
|  1.4%
|   Won
|-
|}

Notes

Democratic Party members of the Maryland House of Delegates
African-American state legislators in Maryland
African-American women in politics
1967 births
Living people
Women state legislators in Maryland
21st-century American politicians
21st-century American women politicians
21st-century African-American women
21st-century African-American politicians
20th-century African-American people
20th-century African-American women